Jessee Wyatt (born 14 April 1996) is an Australian Paralympic athlete with cerebral palsy. He represented Australia at the 2016 Rio Paralympics.

Personal
Wyatt was born in New Zealand on 14 April 1996. He has cerebral palsy and has undergone surgery to assist his mobility.

Career
Wyatt took up athletics in 2012 and is coached by Australian Paralympian John Eden. At the 2015 IPC Athletics World Championships in Doha, he finished fifth in the Men's Shot Put F33 with a throw of 8.69m.

At the 2016 Rio Paralympics, he finished fourth on the Men's Shot Put F33 with a throw of 8.71.

At the 2017 World Para Athletics Championships in London, England, Wyatt finished sixth in the Men's Shot Put F33 with a throw of 8.93m.

References

External links
 
 Jessee Wyatt at Australian Athletics Historical Results
 

Paralympic athletes of Australia
Athletes (track and field) at the 2016 Summer Paralympics
1996 births
Living people
Australian male shot putters
Cerebral Palsy category Paralympic competitors
New Zealand emigrants to Australia